César Luis Salinas Sinka (18 August 196119 July 2020) was a Bolivian association football chairman and president.

Life
Salinas was chairman of The Strongest, the oldest Bolivian football club.  After he left The Strongest, his wife Inés became owner of the team. In 2018 Salinas became president of the Bolivian Football Federation. In mid-2020 Salinas was working with authorities to restart the national football league after months of hiatus due to the COVID-19 pandemic in Bolivia.

Salinas contracted COVID-19 during the COVID-19 pandemic in Bolivia in July 2020. He died in hospital on 19 July 2020, aged 58 to the effects of the virus. A letter was sent from the FIFA President to the Bolivian Football Federation praising Salinas life's work and with sadness for his death. All soccer activities conducted by the Federation were suspended from July 20-22, 2020 in mourning for his death.

References

Association football chairmen and investors
The Strongest
Football people in Bolivia
1961 births
Year of birth uncertain
2020 deaths
People from Pacajes Province
Deaths from the COVID-19 pandemic in Bolivia